Minino is a rural locality (a village) in Verkhnevarzhenskoye Rural Settlement, Velikoustyugsky District, Vologda Oblast, Russia. The population was 3 as of 2002.

Geography 
Minino is located 66 km southeast of Veliky Ustyug (the district's administrative centre) by road. Starina is the nearest rural locality.

References 

Rural localities in Velikoustyugsky District